Shiplake College is a private boarding and day school in Shiplake, by the River Thames, just outside Henley-on-Thames, England. The school, with 520 pupils, takes boys from 11–18 and girls from 16–18. From September 2023 girls will join Year 7 as the school transitions to become fully co-educational by 2027.

History
Shiplake College was founded in 1959 by Alexander and Eunice Everett.  The land on which the school now stands was bought by Robert Harrison in 1888 and the original buildings date from 1890. The main building, which houses Skipwith House and the Great Hall, was built as a private residence for the Harrison family. The house was sold in 1925 and was at first a private home to Edward Goulding, 1st Baron Wargrave and then a prep school, before being sold to the BBC in 1941. Initially the BBC used Shiplake Court as a storage facility until in 1943 the BBC Monitoring Service moved to Caversham and the house became a hostel for BBC staff. The BBC closed the hostel in 1953 and the house remained largely unused until the arrival of the Everetts in 1958. The College now stands in 45 acres of land on the banks of the Thames. In late 1958 the Everetts purchased Shiplake Court with the intention of founding a school, which duly opened as Shiplake Court on 1 May 1959. In 1963 John Eggar, a Derbyshire cricketer who had been a housemaster at Repton School, became headmaster and in 1964 renamed the school Shiplake College. By the time he retired in 1979, numbers had increased to 300.

Girls aged 16–18 were introduced from 1998, forming a co-educational Sixth Form.

Houses
The pupils are allocated into one of eight houses with boys becoming members of either Orchard or Skipwith (if they are day boys) or Burr, Everett or Welsh (if they are boarders). Girls are members of Gilson House, whilst Upper Sixth boys reside in College. Pupils in years 7 and 8 are members of the Lower School.

Sport

Rowing
Rowing is a school sport, with the College located on the banks of the River Thames. In 2021 the Shiplake girls' quad won the Diamond Jubilee Challenge Cup at Henley Royal Regatta, as well as winning The Bea Langridge Trophy at Henley Women's Regatta and the Championship and 2nd Girls Quad events at National Schools' Regatta. The Shiplake boys' eight won the Schools' Head of the River in 2017, 2019 and 2022 respectively. Additionally they achieved silver in the 2019 National Schools' Regatta (Ch 8+)  and bronze in 2017 & 2018 (Ch 8+). They won the Child Beale Cup at National Schools' Regatta in 2015. Several boys have represented England and Great Britain. Most notably, former pupil Will Satch claimed an Olympic Gold medal at Rio 2016 in the Men's Eight, and an Olympic Bronze medal at London 2012 in the Men's Pair event.

In 2022 five crews from the college (35 pupils) qualified to race at Henley Royal Regatta, The most from any one school in the Regatta’s 183 year history.

Rugby
As well as rowing, the College plays rugby. Every season, Shiplake take part in a local rugby event called "Friday Night Lights" hosted by Henley Hawks RFC. In November 2013, Shiplake beat Merchant Taylors' School, Northwood 26–7 in front of a crowd of over 500 people.

Headmasters
The following have served as headmasters of the school:

 Alexander Everett (1959)
 David Skipwith (1960–1962)
 John Eggar (1963–1979)
 Peter Lapping (1979–1988)
 Nick Bevan (1988–2004)
 Gregg Davies (2004–2019)
 Tyrone Howe (2019–present)

Notable former pupils

 Tom Chilton, touring car driver
 Chris Cracknell, rugby player, head coach Fiji 7's team at 2016 Summer Olympics
 Dhani Harrison, George Harrison's son, musician
 Jonty Hearnden, antiques expert on Antiques Roadshow and Cash in the Attic
 Ben Hunt-Davis Gold Olympian rower in the Sydney 2000 Summer Olympics in the men's VIII.
 Nick Jones, Soho House proprietor
 Kia Joorabchian, businessman
 Nicholas Medforth-Mills, Romanian Prince
 Alex Pettyfer, actor
 Chris Standring, jazz musician
 Will Satch, Gold medallist in the Rio 2016 Olympic Games (Rowing Men's Eight); Bronze medallist in the London 2012 Olympic Games (Rowing Men's Pair)
 Alan Pownall, singer-songwriter

References

External links
Official website

Further information
ISI Integrated Inspection 2015
OFSTED Boarding Inspection Report 2011
Department for Education Performance Tables 2010 (GCSE and equivalent)
Department for Education Performance Tables 2010 (Post–16)

1959 establishments in England
Educational institutions established in 1959
Boys' schools in Oxfordshire
Private schools in Oxfordshire
Member schools of the Headmasters' and Headmistresses' Conference
Buildings and structures on the River Thames
Church of England private schools in the Diocese of Oxford
Henley-on-Thames
Boarding schools in Oxfordshire